Qeynarjeh (also Romanized as Qeynarjah, Qīnarjeh, and Qainarjeh; also known as Qeynar, Kainar, Qainar, and Ghanbarcheh) is a village in Dodangeh-ye Olya Rural District, Ziaabad District, Takestan County, Qazvin Province, Iran. At the 2006 census, its population was 108, in 22 families.

References 

Populated places in Takestan County